The Grapevine Canyon Petroglyphs are located in Grapevine Canyon on Spirit Mountain near Laughlin, Nevada, and are listed on the United States National Register of Historic Places. The area is also known as Christmas Tree Pass. The area features over 700 petroglyphs and many rock shelters.

History 

The glyphs were created between 1100 and 1900 AD.  Both the meaning of the glyphs and their creators remains unclear although the area was inhabited by the Mojave.

The site was listed on the National Register of Historic Places on December 15, 1984.  Mapping of the estimated 250 panels of glyphs was conducted in 2009.

In March 2010, David R. Smith, accompanied by two other individuals, defaced 30 areas of petroglyphs by shooting them with an automatic paintball gun. He was sentenced to serve time in federal prison and pay almost $10,000 in restitution.

Grapevine Canyon 
The canyon itself is located in the Bridge Canyon Wilderness and the Spirit Mountain Wilderness as well as partially being in the Lake Mead National Recreation Area.

Images

Notes 

Petroglyphs in Nevada
Mohave tribe
Native American history of Nevada
Archaeological sites on the National Register of Historic Places in Nevada
National Register of Historic Places in Clark County, Nevada